Adilabad mandal is one of the 52 mandals in Adilabad district of the Indian state of Telangana. It is under the administration of Adilabad revenue division and the headquarters are located at Adilabad. The mandal is bounded by Jainad, Bela, Inderavelly, Gudihatnur, Talamadugu and Tamsi mandals.

Government and politics 

Adilabad mandal is one of the three mandals under Adilabad assembly constituency, which in turn represents Adilabad lok sabha constituency of Telangana Legislative Assembly.

Towns and villages 

 census, the mandal has 43 settlements. It includes 2 towns and 41 villages.

The settlements in the mandal are listed below:

Note: M-Municipality

See also 
 List of mandals in Telangana

References 

Mandals in Adilabad district